Tasmannia insipida, the brush pepperbush, is a shrub native to Australia that can grow 1 to 3 metres high (sometimes taller) with reddish stems.

Description
The leaves are lance-shaped from 80 to 200 mm long with a peppery flavour when crushed. The small white flowers occur in umbels from the leaf axils in spring through to summer. Separate male and female flowers are borne on the one plant - male flowers are distinguished by a number of stamens extending from the base of the flower. The flowers are followed by oval-shaped, red berries about 15–20 mm long which darken to deep purple when ripe. In contrast with T. lanceolata and T. stipitata, the seeds of T. insipida are not used commercially for culinary purposes but retain the peppery flavour and are edible.

Distribution
Tasmannia insipida can be found in the cool wet forests or coasts of eastern Australia, from the southern coast of New South Wales to northern Queensland

See also

List of Australian herbs and spices

References

insipida
Magnoliids of Australia
Flora of New South Wales
Flora of Queensland